Sébastien Debs, better known as Ceb, is a French former professional Dota 2 player. He was a member of OG, the team that won the multi-million dollar International 2018 and 2019 tournaments, as well as the team's coach when they won four Dota Major Championships.

Career
Sébastien Debs' professional Dota 2 career started with Team Shakira in 2011. The team first gained notability after placing 4th in Dreamhack Winter 2011. He left the organisation and decided to join a rehash of Mortal Teamwork led by Troels "Synderen" Nielsen in 2012. His first The International tournament with the team ended up last in their group with a score of 3–11. Debs joined Alliance in 2015, but the team posted mediocre results and failed to qualify for The International 2015. In May 2016, OG invited him to coach a new founded organization. They were dominant at the Frankfurt, Manila, Boston and Kiev Majors. Following Resolut1on's departure from the team in March 2018, he was a substitute player before officially filling the offlane position for the team at The International 2018, where he also changed his in-game handle from 7ckngMad to Ceb. Along with the rest of OG, Debs became the first two-time winner of The International after the team's victory at The International 2019. In January 2020, he announced he would be leaving the active roster in order to develop other players on the team before rejoining the active roster that July.

References

External links

 

Living people
Dota players
OG (esports) players
French esports players
20th-century French people
Dota coaches
Year of birth missing (living people)